The 2017–18 UNC Greensboro Spartans men's basketball team represented the University of North Carolina at Greensboro during the 2017–18 NCAA Division I men's basketball season. The Spartans, led by seventh-year head coach Wes Miller, played their home games at the Greensboro Coliseum, with four home games at Fleming Gymnasium, as members of the Southern Conference. They finished the season 27–8, 15–3 in SoCon play, and were the SoCon regular season champions. They defeated The Citadel, Wofford, and East Tennessee State to become champions of the SoCon tournament. They received the SoCon's automatic bid to the NCAA tournament where they lost in the first round to Gonzaga.

Previous season
The Spartans finished the 2016–17 season 25–10, 14–4 in SoCon play to finish in a three-way tie for the SoCon regular season championship. As the No. 1 seed in the SoCon tournament, they defeated The Citadel and Wofford to advance to the championship game where they lost to East Tennessee State. As a conference champion and No. 1 seed in their conference tournament who failed to win their conference tournament, they received an automatic bid to the National Invitation Tournament where they lost in the first round to Syracuse.

Roster

Schedule and results

|-
!colspan=9 style=| Non-conference regular season

|-
!colspan=9 style=| SoCon regular season

|-
!colspan=9 style=| SoCon tournament

|-
!colspan=9 style=| NCAA tournament

References

UNC Greensboro Spartans men's basketball seasons
UNC Greensboro
2018 in sports in North Carolina
2017 in sports in North Carolina
UNC Greensboro